The Richland High School shooting was a school shooting that occurred on Wednesday, November 15, 1995, in Lynnville, Tennessee, a small community located in Giles County. Seventeen-year-old James Ellison "Jamie" Rouse, a senior student at the school, killed one teacher and one student, and seriously wounded another teacher.

Shooting
Rouse used a .22-calibre Remington Viper semi-automatic rifle, which he hid behind bushes before driving to retrieve his friend. His friend Stephen Abbot drove Jamie Rouse the rest of the way to Richland High School. He parked the car outside the school, and Rouse entered through the north entrance hallway. Inside the hallway he confronted teachers Carolyn Yancey and Carolyn Foster.

He then shot both teachers in the head in the view of over fifty students in the hallway. He then aimed his rifle at football coach Ron Shirey; however, he missed and fatally shot freshman Diane Collins in the throat. He was then tackled by a male student and an agriculture teacher, who forcibly took the rifle away from him. Carolyn Foster was killed by a gunshot wound to the head, while Carolyn Yancey survived in serious condition.

Trial 
Rouse was convicted as an adult of one count of first-degree murder, one count of second-degree murder, and one count of first-degree attempted murder. He was sentenced to life in prison without the possibility of parole plus 42 years. Stephen Abbott was convicted of criminal responsibility for second degree murder and criminal response for attempted first and second degree murder as a judge decided Abbott knew what Jamie Rouse was planning because Rouse had told him, "It's going to happen today." Abbott was sentenced to 40 years in prison.

Aftermath 
Rouse is currently imprisoned in the South Central Correctional Facility.
As of January 2016, he was up for resentencing due to the Supreme Court cases: Miller v. Alabama and Montgomery v. Louisiana which have banned juvenile offenders from getting a mandatory life without parole sentence and required those who were previously sentenced to life to be given a chance for a resentencing.

See also
 List of school shootings in the United States (before 2000)
 List of school-related attacks

References

1995 murders in the United States
School killings in the United States
Giles County, Tennessee
American prisoners sentenced to life imprisonment
Murder in Tennessee
School shootings committed by pupils
1995 in Tennessee
1995 disasters in the United States
Crimes in Tennessee
November 1995 events in the United States
High school shootings in the United States